Phyllis April King is a British poet. She appears and reads her material on Ivor Cutler's albums Dandruff, Velvet Donkey and Jammy Smears. King designed some of the Ivor Cutler album covers, and has published poetry and children's books. She worked with Cutler on the radio series King Cutler which was broadcast on BBC Radio 3 in 1990.

Personal life
King was in a long-term relationship with Ivor Cutler for over forty years up to his death in 2006 though they did not live together, preferring to retain their independence. Like Cutler, she was a teacher. Cutler wrote the song "Beautiful Cosmos" about her. She has a daughter and lives in Wiltshire.

Stage portrayal
In 2014 she was portrayed by Elicia Daly in the stage play The Beautiful Cosmos of Ivor Cutler, a co-production by Vanishing Point and National Theatre of Scotland.

Bibliography

Poetry

 Dust – Newcastle upon Tyne: Morden Tower Publications, 1978.
 Close Views –  Newcastle upon Tyne: Morden Tower Publications, 1980.

Children's books

 The Hungry Cat – London: Walker, 1986. (Illustrated by Phyllis King) 
 Apple Green and Runner Bean – London: Walker, 1993. (Illustrated by Phyllis King)

References

English women poets
Living people
Year of birth missing (living people)